Nymphaea candida J. Presl is a species of flowering plant in the genus Nymphaea, native to quiet freshwater habitats in Eurasia, it is in flower from July to August. It is sometimes treated as a subspecies of N. alba (N. alba L. subsp. candida (J. Presl) Korsh.)

Description
Nymphaea candida is an aquatic herbaceous perennial that is laticiferous and rooted. It has a spread of approximately 60 cm and a plant depth from 10 to 30 cm. It has rhizomes that are stoloniferous and unbranched.  There are about 10-20 leaves that are 9–19 cm across that are usually floating or submerged. The leaves are membranous when young and prominently veined when mature. The plant prefers growing in water-depths of about 60–80 cm.

Nymphaea candida has a small white flower (10–20 cm across) with a yellow center. The bisexual flower usually floats alone. The peduncles are long and there are 4 sepals. There are about 12-24 petals on each flower. The petals can be described as oblong-ovate, apex obtuse, and white. The outer petals are shorter than the inner ones.

Taxonomy
The plant was originally discovered and described by J. Presl and C Presl. in 1882. The taxonomic status of this species is unknown.

Synonyms
 Castalia biradiata (Sommerauer) Hayek
 Castalia candida (C. Presl) Schinz & Thell.
 Castalia colchica Woronow ex Grossh.
 Castalia semiaperta (C. Klinggr.) Fritsch
 Leuconymphaea candida (C. Presl) Kuntze

Distribution and habitat
It grows in the quiet freshwaters in Eurasia. The plant grows only in water, as it is an aquatic plant, mainly in ponds, lakes, and slow flowing streams.

References

External links

candida